Jean-Baptiste Eugène Abel (12 January 1863 – 30 September 1921) was a French politician who was briefly Minister of Labor and Social Welfare, and later was Governor-General of Algeria.

Early years

Jean-Baptiste Eugène Abel was born in Toulon on 12 January 1863.
His father, Alphonse Abel, proclaimed the Republic in Toulon on 5 September 1870, and was interim mayor of the city.
Jean-Baptiste Abel attended the Lycée de Toulon, then studied law and became an advocate in Toulon.
In 1891 he was elected in a by-election to the General Council of the Var department representing Toulon West.
He retained his seat in the departmental elections the next year, and in 1893 became vice-president of the council.

Deputy

Abel ran successfully for election on the Radical platform as national deputy for the 1st district of Toulon in the general elections of August–September 1893.
After taking his seat he was particularly involved in marine questions.
He was appointed secretary of the chamber from 12 January 1897 to the end of the legislature.
He ran again in the general election of 8–22 May 1898 but was defeated.
He was appointed counselor to the Riom court of appeal, and then to the Nîmes court of appeal, holding this position for the next ten years.

Abel ran again in the general elections of April–May 1910 as national deputy for the 1st district of Toulon, and was elected.
He was again involved in marine issues, and was a member of the marine committee.
He was reelected in the April–May 1914 general elections, and was appointed Minister of Labor and Social Welfare in the short-lived cabinet of Alexandre Ribot, holding office from 9–13 June 1914. He was elected vice-president of the chamber in November 1915.
In a debate that began on 13 March 1919 he argued that the fortifications in Paris and elsewhere were obsolete, saying, "Today, the dogma of the inviolability of fortifications has fallen in the face of the all-too-painful lessons of the last war."

Governor of Algeria

In July 1919 Abel accepted the post of Governor-General of Algeria from Prime Minister Georges Clemenceau, holding this office while remaining a deputy.
The appointment, effective 31 July 1919, was temporary.
He resigned as vice-president of the chamber on 5 August 1919.
He was reelected as deputy in the general elections of 16 November 1919.
He now appeared in the chamber only to represent the government on discussions about Algeria.

Abel replaced Charles Jonnart as governor-general.
Jonnart had enacted a law that gave many Algerians the right to obtain French citizenship.
However, they had to abandon traditional customs such as polygamy to qualify, and most refused. 
From 1919 to 1923 there were only 317 requests for citizenship by Algerian veterans, of which 115 were rejected.
In 1920 Abel said that France must admit Algerians into their national structure, or "beware lest they do not soon create one for themselves."

The colony was unsettled due to the effects of World War I (1914–18) followed by poor harvests.
He was unable to solve these problems, but remained in Algeria until 31 August 1921, when he returned to Toulon in deteriorating health.
He died in Toulon on 30 September 1921 aged 58.

Notes

Sources

1863 births
1921 deaths
Politicians from Toulon
Independent Radical politicians
Democratic Republican Alliance politicians
French Ministers of Labour and Social Affairs
Members of the 6th Chamber of Deputies of the French Third Republic
Members of the 10th Chamber of Deputies of the French Third Republic
Members of the 11th Chamber of Deputies of the French Third Republic
Members of the 12th Chamber of Deputies of the French Third Republic
Governors general of Algeria
19th-century French lawyers